Unna-Königsborn station is located in the city of Unna in the German state of North Rhine-Westphalia. It is at the end of the remaining section of the line from Dortmund. Line S 4 trains of the Rhine-Ruhr S-Bahn reverse here on their way to and from Unna station. It is classified by Deutsche Bahn as a category 6 station.

The station is served by S 4 services between Unna and Dortmund-Lütgendortmund station via Dortmund Stadthaus and Dortmund-Dorstfeld at 30-minute intervals (15-minute intervals in the peak between Dortmund-Lütgendortmund and Unna-Königsborn).

It is also served by bus route C43 at 60-minute intervals during the day and R53 at 20- or 40-minute intervals, both operated by Verkehrsgesellschaft Kreis Unna.

Notes

Rhine-Ruhr S-Bahn stations
S4 (Rhine-Ruhr S-Bahn)
Railway stations in Germany opened in 1876
Unna